Mastara is a village in the Talin Municipality of the Aragatsotn Province of Armenia.  The 5th-century Armenian Church of S. Hovhannes is situated in the northeastern half of the village, while the church of S. Stepanos Nakhava sits on a hilltop to the north. There is also the small medieval Tukh Manuk Church in the village to the southeast.

Etymology 
The name Mastara is thought to be derived from the words mas, meaning "a piece", and tara, "I buried/took". This comes from the popular legend that Gregory the Illuminator brought back relics of John the Baptist from Caesaria, a fragment of which he enshrined beneath the Church of S. Hovhannes.

Gallery

References 

 
 Report of the results of the 2001 Armenian Census

Populated places in Aragatsotn Province